William Maxwell Hamilton  (2 July 1909 – 14 August 1992) was a New Zealand agricultural scientist and scientific administrator. He was born in Warkworth, New Zealand, on 2 July 1909.

In the 1970 Queen's Birthday Honours, Hamilton was appointed a Commander of the Order of the British Empire, for services as director-general of the Department of Scientific and Industrial Research. In 1971, he was conferred an honorary Doctor of Science degree by Massey University.

References

1909 births
1992 deaths
People from Warkworth, New Zealand
New Zealand horticulturists
New Zealand Commanders of the Order of the British Empire
20th-century New Zealand botanists
People associated with Department of Scientific and Industrial Research (New Zealand)